The 2013–14 Serie B (known as the Serie B Eurobet for sponsorship reasons) was the 82nd season since its establishment in 1929. A total of 22 teams contested the league: 15 of which were returning from the 2012–13 season, 4 of which were promoted from Lega Pro Prima Divisione, and three relegated from Serie A.

The league features three clubs relegated from Serie A: Pescara returned after a one-year stint, Siena after two seasons, and Palermo after nine seasons.

Four teams were promoted from Lega Pro Prima Divisione, with only two certain as of May 2013: Avellino, after four seasons, and Trapani, which will make their debut in the league. On 16 June, the winners of the Lega Pro Prima Divisione play-off finals were determined as two newcomers: Carpi and Latina.

Changes from last season

Playoff format
A new playoff format changes the number of playoff participants from four (third through sixth place) to a variable-size playoff including up to six teams (third through eighth place). Qualifying teams must finish the season within a "playoff margin" of 14 points from the third place team. Similar to previous seasons, if the third-place team finishes 10 or more points above the fourth place team, no playoffs will be held.

The following formats will be used for playoffs consisting of two to six teams:
 Two teams, single round: 3 plays 4.
 Three teams, two rounds: 4 plays 5 in semifinal; semifinal winner plays 3.
 Four teams, two rounds: 3 plays 6 and 4 plays 5 in semifinals; semifinal winners play each other.
 Five teams, three rounds: 6 plays 7 in opening round; 3 plays 6/7 and 4 plays 5 in semifinals; semifinal winners play each other.
 Six teams, three rounds: 5 plays 8 and 6 plays 7 in opening round; 3 plays 6/7 and 4 plays 5/8 in semifinals; semifinal winners play each other.

Semifinals and finals are two-legged ties, while opening round matches are single legs hosted by the higher-ranked team.

Team changes

From Serie B
Promoted to Serie A
 Sassuolo
 Verona
 Livorno

Relegated to Lega Pro Prima Divisione
 Vicenza
 Ascoli
 Pro Vercelli
 Grosseto

To Serie B
Relegated from Serie A
 Palermo
 Siena
 Pescara

Promoted from Lega Pro Prima Divisione (Girone A)
 Trapani
 Carpi

Promoted from Lega Pro Prima Divisione (Girone B)
 Avellino
 Latina

Teams

Number of teams by region

Stadia and locations

Personnel and kits

Managerial changes

League table

When rumors about Siena's probable collapse arrived to the FIGC in May, the Federation decided to seize the opportunity to reduce the league. However, Novara appealed against this decision in June. When the CONI agreed with the Piedmontese club, the angry FIGC decided to choose a Lega Pro team instead of Novara.

Playoffs

Promotion playoffs
Starting from this season, six teams played in the promotion playoffs instead of four. A preliminary one-legged round, played at the home venue of the best placed one, involved the teams from 5th to 8th place. The two winning teams then play against 3rd of 4th-placed teams in a two-legged semifinal. The higher placed team plays the second leg of the promotion playoff at home. If scores are tied after both games in the semifinals the higher placed team progresses to the final. The same conditions apply to the final except for there being extra time played if scores are tied after both games, the higher placed team will be promoted if scores are still level at the end of this period.

Relegation play-out
In case of an aggregate tie, the best placed team wins.

Results

Top goalscorers

 - includes 2 goals in the play-offs.
 - includes 1 goal in the play-offs.

References

2013-14
Italy
2